Esfidan may refer to:
 Esfidan, Isfahan
 Esfidan, Bojnord, North Khorasan
 Esfidan, Maneh and Samalqan, North Khorasan